The Indian Institute of Education and Business Management (now known as Indus Business School) is a business school located in Pune, Maharashtra. AICTE recognizes the institute to confer Post graduate diploma in management degrees to 180 students across 2 shifts. It was not present in the annual MHRD rankings, which enlisted the top 75 Indian B-schools, but it was ranked 3rd among the top indian business schools of excellence by CSR-GHRDC B-schools survey of 2019(issued in November, 2019).
IIEBM is led by Dr. Jai Singh, Trustee & Managing Director.

IIEBM was established in the year 2000 by Shrimant Vijaysinh Naik Nimbalkar Alias Shivajiraje, scion of the ruling family of Phaltan, District Satara and Col. Vinod Marwaha, a visionary, entrepreneur and philanthropist.

References

External links
 Indus Business School
 

Business schools in Maharashtra
Universities and colleges in Pune
Educational institutions established in 2000
2000 establishments in Maharashtra